Old Town is a neighborhood of San Diego, California. It contains  and is bounded by Interstate 8 on the north, Interstate 5 on the west, Mission Hills on the east and Bankers Hill on the south. It is the oldest settled area in San Diego and is the site of the first European settlement in present-day California. It contains Old Town San Diego State Historic Park and Presidio Park, both of which are listed on the National Register of Historic Places.

History

Before European contact, the Kumeyaay established the village of Cosoy (Kosa'aay) in the Kumeyaay language), which consisted of thirty to forty families living in pyramid-shaped housing structures.

The San Diego Presidio and Mission San Diego de Alcalá were founded in 1769 by Gaspar de Portolá and Junípero Serra on a bluff at the western end of the San Diego River valley adjacent to the village of Cosoy after the villagers had provided resources to the Portolá expedition. The Presidio and Mission constituted the first Spanish settlement in Alta California, the present day state of California. After five years the Mission moved to a location several miles upriver, while the Presidio on its hill remained the primary settlement. In the 1820s the town of San Diego grew up at the base of the bluff, at the site commemorated by Old Town San Diego State Historic Park, while the Presidio fell into disrepair. 

In 1834 the Mexican government granted San Diego the status of a pueblo, or chartered town. However, the population of the town declined so much that in 1838 its pueblo status was revoked. One problem was the town's location far from navigable water. All imports and exports had to be brought ashore in Point Loma and carried several miles over the La Playa Trail to the town.

When California was admitted to the United States in 1850, San Diego (still largely limited to the Old Town area) was made the county seat of San Diego County, even though the town's population was only 650.

The Old Town area remained the heart of the city of San Diego until the 1860s, when a newcomer to San Diego named Alonzo Horton began to promote development at the site of present-day Downtown San Diego. Residents and businesses quickly abandoned "Old Town" for Horton's "New Town" because of New Town's proximity to shipping. In 1871, government records were moved from Old Town to a new county courthouse in New Town, and Downtown permanently eclipsed Old Town as the focal point of San Diego.

In the 1910s, Old Town became one of the many San Diego neighborhoods connected by the Class 1 streetcars and an extensive San Diego public transit system that was spurred by the Panama-California Exposition of 1915 and built by John D. Spreckels. These streetcars became a fixture of this neighborhood until their retirement in 1939.

Economy

The Old Town neighborhood has nine hotels, 32 restaurants and more than 100 specialty shops. Shopping areas within Old Town include Fiesta de Reyes ("Party of Kings") and Bazaar del Mundo. There are 12 art galleries and 27 historic buildings and sites, including Old Town San Diego State Historic Park, Presidio Park, and the Mormon Battalion Visitor Center. The area also contains Heritage Park, a county park showcasing historic buildings which were moved to the site from other locations, including several Victorian homes and San Diego's first synagogue, Temple Beth Israel. A major government building is the District 11 headquarters of Caltrans, the California Department of Transportation.

Annual events
San Diego's Cinco de Mayo celebration is held in Old Town every year.

The Old Town Art Festival takes place in October of each year.

San Diego's Dia de los Muertos is annual community-wide celebration held every November 1 and 2. 

Fiesta Navidad is a two-day Christmas festival in December, highlighted by the Mexican tradition of Las Posadas, which re-enacts the story of Mary and Joseph's journey to Bethlehem for the first Christmas.

Community organizations
The Old Town Community Planning Committee advises the city on land use and other issues. The Old Town San Diego Chamber of Commerce promotes business interests and tourism. Local service organizations include a Kiwanis club.

The Boosters of Old Town (BOOT) is a support organization for Old Town San Diego State Historic Park. Their financial support and assistance helps provide funds for a period attire clothing bank and for special programming and events such as Ladies Day, Historic 4th of July, Fiestas Patrias, Holiday in the Park, and descendant activities.  They also operate the BOOT Store in the Robinson-Rose Visitor's Center, support the Blacksmith Shop, maintain a history research library, and publish the "Poppy Paper," an official monthly newsletter.

The nonprofit Save Our Heritage Organisation (SOHO) operates two museums in Old Town San Diego: the Adobe Chapel Museum and the Whaley House Museum.

Infrastructure

The Old Town Transit Center is a major intermodal transportation station where travelers can transfer between San Diego Metropolitan Transit System city buses, the Green Line of the San Diego Trolley, the Coaster commuter rail line, and the regional rail system of Amtrak in the form of its intercity Pacific Surfliner route.

References

See also

 History of San Diego
 Two Years Before the Mast by Richard Henry Dana
 Ramona by Helen Hunt Jackson

Neighborhoods in San Diego
History of San Diego